Royce Cadman (born 13 October 1987) is an English rugby union player. His position is lock forward.

Cadman signed a dual contract with the Newport Gwent Dragons regional team and Bedwas RFC in 2010 after finishing university at Hartpury College where he won 3 busa/bucs trophies, 3 EDF finals and achieved representing Gloucester A, Gloucestershire County (reaching the county final twice) and playing for England students.

Cadman made his debut for the Dragons in a pre season game against Cornish pirates in penzance in 2010 coming off the bench. Then starting, he made his first appearance in a domestic competition on 15 October 2011 against Bath Rugby.

He left Dragons to join Doncaster Knights for the 2012-2013 season.

References 

http://www.newcastlefalcons.co.uk/news/story/12-01-2010-pair-in-england-students-call
http://www.thisisgloucestershire.co.uk/Cadman-win-England/story-11915811-detail/story.html
http://www.rfu.com/News/2010/January/News%20Articles/260110_england_students_22

External links 
 Newport Gwent Dragons profile
 Hartpury College
Hartpury news
 LV Cup
 Bedwas profile

1987 births
Living people
Bedwas RFC players
Dragons RFC players
English rugby union players
Rugby union players from Canterbury